Robert Clayton may refer to:
Robert Clayton (cricketer) (1844–1901), Welsh cricketer
Robert Clayton (City of London MP) (1629–1707), Lord Mayor of London, MP for the City of London and for Bletchingley
Robert Clayton (bishop) (1695–1758), Irish Protestant bishop
Sir Robert James Clayton (1915–1998), British electronics engineer and executive
Rob Clayton, American painter, one of the Clayton Brothers
Bob Clayton (1922–1979), American game show host
Bob Clayton (footballer), Australian rules footballer
Robert N. Clayton (1930–2017), Canadian-American National Medal of Science laureate
Clayton baronets:
Sir Robert Clayton, 2nd Baronet, of Adlington (1746–1839)
Sir Robert Clayton, 3rd Baronet, of Marden (c. 1740–1799), MP for several seats
Sir Robert Alan Clayton-East-Clayton, 9th Baronet Clayton, of Marden (1908–1932)
Sir Robert Alan Clayton East-Clayton, 5th Baronet of Hall Place, Maidenhead (1908–1932)
Sir Robert Clayton, 13th Baronet of Marden (1975-)

See also
Clayton (surname)